The Chamail are a Muslim community, found in the state of Bihar, India.

See also
 Bakho
 Churihar

References

Dalit Muslim
Social groups of Bihar
Indian castes
Muslim communities of India
Muslim communities of Bihar
Dalit communities